This is a list of television programmes that were broadcast on Bravo in the United Kingdom and Ireland from 1985 to 2011.

Summary 
The schedule for Bravo mainly consisted of a mixture of American and British comedy, drama and factual programming. The channel was targeted towards a male audience ranging from the 25 to 45 age group. The channel also showed commissioned content from other Virgin Media Television channels as well as its own commissioned programmes on both Bravo and Bravo 2.

Former Programming (originally shown by others)

10 Things You Didn't Know About
1000 Ways to Die
Adult Swim 
Airwolf
Affliction: Day of Reckoning
Alias
America's Hardest Bounty Hunters
Amsterdam Nights
Aqua Teen Hunger Force
Automan
A-Z of Bad Boys
Barbershop
Battle Dome
Battlestar Galactica
Beavis and Butt-Head
Blade: The Series
Blues and Twos (Also Shown on Bravo 2)
Booze Britain (Also Shown on Bravo 2)
Britain's Toughest Towns
Brit Cops
Brits Behind Bars: America's Toughest Jail
Buck Rogers in the 25th Century
Car Sharks
Caribbean Cops
Chuck
Cold Squad
Cops (Also Shown on Bravo 2)
Cops, Cars & Superstars I (Also Shown on Bravo 2) 
Cops, Cars & Superstars II (Also Shown on Bravo 2)
Cops, Cars & Superstars III (Also Shown on Bravo 2)
Cops Uncut 
Costa Del Street Crime
Dan August
Dante
Day Break
Disorderly Conduct: Cops on Camera
Dog the Bounty Hunter
ECW on TNN
ECW Hardcore TV
Edgar Wallace
Excel Saga
Extreme: Animal Attacks
Flash Gordon's Trip to Mars
Football Italia
Football Saved My Life
Gamepad
Gamer.tv
Gamer's Guide To:
Highway Patrol
Hogan's Heroes
Hulk Hogan's Celebrity Championship Wrestling
In Your Face
It's Always Sunny In Philadelphia
I Predict a Riot
King of Cars
Knight Rider
Laid Bare
Leverage
Life on Mars
Loving You
MacGyver
Man's Work
Masters of Horror
Monster Jam
Moral Orel
Most Shocking
Motorway (Also Shown on Bravo 2)
Motorway Patrol (Also Shown on Bravo 2)
Night Stalker
The PJs
Playr
Police Beat (Also Shown on Bravo 2)
Protect and Serve (Also Shown on Bravo 2) 
Real TV (Also Shown on Bravo 2)
Robot Wars
Roger Ramjet
Saber of London
Sin Cities
Space Ghost: Coast to Coast
Space Precinct
Spartacus: Blood and Sand
Spider-Man
Star Trek: The Next Generation
Star Trek: Deep Space Nine
Star Trek: Voyager
Starsky and Hutch
Street Crime UK (Also Shown on Bravo 2)
Street Hawk
Sun, Sea and A&E
That '70s Show
The A-Team
The Brittas Empire
The Burning Zone
The Doris Day Show
The Dudesons
The Dukes of Hazzard
The Kill Point 	
The Mod Squad
The Persuaders!
The PJs
The Twilight Zone
The Ultimate Fighter
The Unit
The X-Files
Thunderbirds
TNA Epics
TNA iMPACT!
Towers of London
Travel Sick
When Sports Go Bad: Wacked Out
Walker, Texas Ranger
WCW Nitro
WCW Thunder
When Games Attack (Also Shown on Bravo 2)
World's Most Amazing Videos (Also Shown on Bravo 2)

References 

Bravo programmes
Bravo